Coracornis is a genus of birds in the family Pachycephalidae. The two species are found in Indonesia.

Taxonomy and systematics
Formerly, the genus Coracornis was considered to be monotypic, containing only the maroon-backed whistler. The Sangihe shrikethrush was added in 2013 following recent genetic studies.

Species
Two species are recognized:
 Maroon-backed whistler (Coracornis raveni)
 Sangihe whistler (Coracornis sanghirensis)

References 

 
Bird genera
Taxa named by Joseph Harvey Riley
Taxonomy articles created by Polbot